Conocephalus brevipennis, the short-winged meadow katydid, is a species of meadow katydid in the family Tettigoniidae. It is found in North America and the Caribbean.

References

External links

 

brevipennis
Articles created by Qbugbot
Insects described in 1863